Federal Route 3101 is a federal road in Sibu Division, Sarawak, Malaysia. It is a main route to Kanowit.

At most sections, the Federal Route 3101 was built under the JKR R5 road standard, with a speed limit of 90 km/h.

List of junctions and towns

References

Malaysian Federal Roads